Alcyna lucida, a species of sea snail, a marine gastropod mollusk in the family Trochidae.

Description
The rather solid, imperforate. subpellucid shell is white, with subdistant spiral riblets, and very minute longitudinal striae. The five, convex whorls show an impressed suture. The columellar tooth and external varix are strong.

Distribution
This species occurs in the Indian Ocean off Mauritius.

References

lucida
Gastropods described in 1868